Liefmans is a Belgian brewery which produces oud bruin and other Belgian beers. It was founded in 1679. The company went bankrupt in 2008 and was acquired by Duvel Moortgat. Liefmans' wheat beer, Dentergems Wit, and a Belgian ale, Lucifer, were subsequently taken over by Het Anker Brewery.

References

External links
 Official website
 Press release regarding acquisition

Breweries of Flanders
Companies based in East Flanders
Oudenaarde